Greenswamp is a rural locality in the Western Downs Region, Queensland, Australia.

Geography 
The locality is bounded to the south-east by the Condamine River.

The land use is a mixture of grazing on native vegetation on the hilly land and growing crops on the flatter lower land.

History 
Green Swamp State School opened circa 1936. It closed in 1950.

Education 
There are no schools in Greenswamp. The nearest primary and secondary schools are Chincilla State School and Chinchilla State High School in neighbouring Chinchilla to the east.

References 

Western Downs Region
Localities in Queensland